The 1796 United States presidential election in New York took place between November 4 and December 7, 1796, as part of the 1796 United States presidential election. The state legislature chose 12 representatives, or electors to the Electoral College, who voted for President and Vice President.

During this election, New York cast 12 electoral votes for Vice President John Adams.

See also
 United States presidential elections in New York

References

New York
1796
1796 New York (state) elections